Orin is a masculine given name, sometimes spelled Orrin.

Orin or Orinn may also refer to:

Places

In the United States
 Orrin, North Dakota, an unincorporated community
 Orin, Washington, an unincorporated community
 Orin, Wyoming, a census-designated place

Elsewhere
 Orin, Pyrénées-Atlantiques, a commune in southwestern France
 Orin, Iran, a village in Tehran Province
 Orin, Nigeria, a town or administrative division in Ekiti State
 River Orrin, a river in Ross, Scotland

Surname
 Deborah Orin (1947–2007), American journalist and Washington D.C. bureau chief for the New York Post
 Max Orrin (born 1994), English professional golfer

Technology
 ORiN (Open Robot/Resource interface for the Network), a standard network interface for factory automation systems
 Tegra Orin, a GPU semiconductor family from Nvidia
 Drive AGX Orin, a GPU board family from Nvidia

Other uses
 Orin (apple), a variety of Japanese apple

See also
 Oak Ridge Institute of Nuclear Studies (ORINS), predecessor of Oak Ridge Associated Universities, a consortium of American universities
 Oren (disambiguation)